The 35th District of the Iowa Senate is located in eastern Iowa, and is currently composed of Linn County.

Current elected officials
Todd Taylor is the senator currently representing the 35th District.

The area of the 35th District contains two Iowa House of Representatives districts:
The 69th District (represented by Kirsten Running-Marquardt)
The 70th District (represented by Tracy Ehlert)

The district is also located in Iowa's 1st congressional district, which is represented by Ashley Hinson.

Past senators
The district has previously been represented by:

William Dieleman, 1983–1992
Florence Buhr, 1993–1994
Dick Dearden, 1995–2002
Jeff Lamberti, 2003–2006
Larry Noble, 2007–2010
Jack Whitver, 2011–2012
Wally Horn, 2013–2018
Todd Taylor, 2019–present

See also
Iowa General Assembly
Iowa Senate

References

35